Hongqiao Subdistrict may refer to the following locations in China:
 Hongqiao Subdistrict, Aksu (红桥街道), Xinjiang
Written as "洪桥街道"
 Hongqiao Subdistrict, Guangzhou (洪桥街道), in Yuexiu District
 Hongqiao Subdistrict, Qidong (洪桥街道), in Qidong County, Hunan
Written as "虹桥街道"
 Hongqiao Subdistrict, Shanghai, in Changning District, named after Hongqiao Road in Shanghai.
 Hongqiao Subdistrict, Wusu, Xinjiang
 Hongqiao Subdistrict, Xuanwei, Yunnan